Yinchuan Helanshan Football Club was an association football club based in Yinchuan, Ningxia, China. The Helan Mountain Stadium was their home venue.

History
Yinchuan Helanshan F.C. was established on 17 July 2013 by Yinchuan Sports Federation.

Yinchuan Helanshan F.C. was disqualified for 2020 China League Two on 4 February 2020 due to its failure to hand the salary and bonus confirmation form in time.

Name changes

Coaching staff

Managerial history

  Abraham García (2014)
  Zhu Bo (2015)
  Kazuo Uchida (2016)
  Wang Haiming (2017)
  Sun Wei (2017)
  Fan Yuhong (2018)
  Zhao Changhong (2019–2020)

Results
All-time league rankings

As of the end of 2019 season.

 In group stage.

Key
 Pld = Played
 W = Games won
 D = Games drawn
 L = Games lost
 F = Goals for
 A = Goals against
 Pts = Points
 Pos = Final position

 DNQ = Did not qualify
 DNE = Did not enter
 NH = Not Held
 – = Does Not Exist
 R1 = Round 1
 R2 = Round 2
 R3 = Round 3
 R4 = Round 4

 F = Final
 SF = Semi-finals
 QF = Quarter-finals
 R16 = Round of 16
 Group = Group stage
 GS2 = Second Group stage
 QR1 = First Qualifying Round
 QR2 = Second Qualifying Round
 QR3 = Third Qualifying Round

References

Football clubs in China
Defunct football clubs in China

2020 disestablishments in China
Association football clubs disestablished in 2020